William Hodgson Barrow (1 September 1784 – 29 January 1876) was an English Conservative politician who sat in the House of Commons from 1851 to 1874.

Barrow was the son of the Rev. Richard Barrow, of Southwell and his wife Mary Hodgkinson, daughter of George Hodgkinson. His uncle was William Barrow archdeacon of Nottingham. He was educated at the Collegiate School at Southwell, and practised as an attorney from 1806 to 1833. He was a Fellow of the Royal Agricultural Society, the Royal Botanic Society, and the Archaeological Society. He was a Deputy Lieutenant and J.P. for Nottinghamshire and was High Sheriff of Nottinghamshire in 1845.

In 1851 Barrow was elected at a by-election as a Member of Parliament (MP) for South Nottinghamshire. He was returned unopposed at the five succeeding general elections and held the seat until 1874,
when at 89 he retired.

Barrow died unmarried at the age of 91.

References

External links
 

1784 births
1876 deaths
Conservative Party (UK) MPs for English constituencies
Deputy Lieutenants of Nottinghamshire
High Sheriffs of Nottinghamshire
People educated at Southwell Minster Collegiate Grammar School
UK MPs 1847–1852
UK MPs 1852–1857
UK MPs 1857–1859
UK MPs 1859–1865
UK MPs 1865–1868
UK MPs 1868–1874